The 2018–19 season is Grimsby Town's 141st season of existence and their third consecutive season in League Two. Along with competing in League Two, the club will also participate in the FA Cup, EFL Cup and EFL Trophy.

The season covers the period from 1 July 2018 to 30 June 2019.

Competitions

Friendlies 
The club have confirmed the first four pre-season friendlies will be against Cleethorpes Town, Sunderland, York City and Doncaster Rovers.

The annual pre-season fixture versus Cleethorpes Town will take place at the new home ground of their opponents, The Linden Club, on Saturday 7 July.

The Mariners will then play host to EFL League One side Sunderland on Tuesday 17 July before travelling to York City on Saturday 21 July. Town will then host Doncaster Rovers at Blundell Park on Tuesday 24 July.

League Two

League table

Results summary

Results by matchday

Matches
On 21 June 2018, the League Two fixtures for the forthcoming season were announced.

FA Cup

The first round draw was made live on BBC by Dennis Wise and Dion Dublin on 22 October. The draw for the second round was made live on BBC and BT by Mark Schwarzer and Glenn Murray on 12 November. The third round draw was made live on BBC by Ruud Gullit and Paul Ince from Stamford Bridge on 3 December 2018.

EFL Cup

On 15 June 2018, the draw for the first round was made in Vietnam.

EFL Trophy
On 13 July 2018, the initial group stage draw bar the U21 invited clubs was announced. It was later announced that Northern Group G would include Newcastle United U21.

Top scorers

Transfers

Transfers in

Transfers out

Loans in

Loans out

References

Grimsby Town F.C. seasons
Grimsby Town